The Battle of the Espero Convoy on 28 June 1940, was the first surface engagement between Italian and Allied warships of the Second World War. Three modern  Italian destroyers made a run from Taranto for Tobruk in Libya to transport Blackshirt anti-tank units, in case of an armoured attack from Egypt by the British.

By coincidence, the Mediterranean Fleet was at sea to conduct a destroyer anti-submarine sweep around Crete and provide cover for three Allied convoys to Egypt, one from Turkey and two from Malta. British aircraft from Malta spotted the Italian destroyers and the 7th Cruiser Squadron turned to intercept them; a running fight took place south-west of Crete, in which the destroyers were impeded by their cargoes and an adverse sea.

Convoy AS 1 from Turkey arrived safely by 3 July.

Background

Italian belligerence

Once landed, supplies and men had to be moved by lorry or small coastal craft. In late 1939, assuming overwhelming Anglo-French naval superiority, Marshal Pietro Badoglio, the Chief of Staff of the Italian Army, established a policy of maintaining internal security and to have supplies sufficient for a year. On 9 April, Badoglio met the three service chiefs and announced the

On 30 May, Badoglio ordered the service chiefs to be ready for hostilities by 5 June.

Italian sea communications

On 11 April, the naval chief of staff, Admiral Domenico Cavagnari, reported his doubts about the possibility of offensive action against opponents who could replace losses far quicker than Italy. Going to war with a defensive strategy was unprecedented and at the end of the war, Italy might have no territorial gains, no navy and no air force. The navy planned to keep its forces concentrated to generate maximum firepower, which precluded the protection of merchant shipping, except on rare occasions; the French to the west and British to the east meant that convoying ships from Italy to Libya would be impossible. Mussolini saw off such doubts by predicting a war of three months' duration, when Libya had six months' supplies.

On 13 June, the first request arrived from Libya for the dispatch of "indispensable" supplies. In 1940, the  had two modernised battleships and 19 cruisers to challenge the British and French Mediterranean fleets of three aircraft carriers, eleven battleships and 23 cruisers, a superiority of 4:1 in tonnage, which could be reinforced from outside the Mediterranean at will. The British ships were based at Gibraltar and Alexandria, with no ships based at Malta and the French at Toulon and Bizerte, the main Italian bases being Naples and Taranto, with small forces based in Sicilian ports. The Italian forces could unite by sailing through the Strait of Messina but the narrows were an obvious place for an ambush.

Air power

The proponents of land-based air power disdained the naval preference for aircraft carriers and specialist aircraft, in favour of land-based aircraft fulfilling all of the requirements of maritime aviation, apart from an acceptance of the need for reconnaissance by "Aviation for the Navy" in which the navy had operational control and sent observers aloft.

Prelude

Italian naval operations

On 10 June 1940, Italy declared war on Britain and France. Badoglio expected a British advance into Cyrenaica (eastern Libya) led by armoured forces. On 11 June, the 3rd and 7th Cruiser divisions conducted an abortive patrol in the Strait of Sicily; next morning, two British cruisers were spotted south of Crete heading west and the 3rd Cruiser Division and two destroyer squadrons were sent to patrol the route to Malta. The 1st and 8th Cruiser squadrons patrolled the Ionian Sea and two destroyer squadrons sailed between Sicily and Malta. From 11 June to 16 August, the specialist  Group dredged up the seven British cables from the seabed around Malta and took away thousands of yards of cable to prevent them from being reconnected.

Italian supply operations

The difficulty of escorting merchant ships to Tobruk led to a decision to use warships and submarines. On 19 June, the submarine  sailed for Tobruk carrying ammunition and the next day, a destroyer squadron led by  departed Augusta for Benghazi, carrying troops and anti-tank guns.

Operation MA 3

On 27 June, five destroyers were to sail from Alexandria on an anti-submarine sweep near th Ionian island of Kythira and them sail on to Malta to form the close escort for convoys MF 1 and MS 2 to Alexandria. Intelligence about Italian submarines led to the sweep being diverted through the Kasos Strait east of Crete, then north of the island, thence past Kythira to Malta. Short Sunderland flying boats of 201 Group RAF, based in Malta, were to co-operate with the naval operations in the Ionian Sea. On the Italian declaration of war, the passenger liner El Nil, en route for Egypt from Marseilles, Knight of Malta and interned Italian ship  were in Malta and in Operation  these ships formed the fast convoy  [].

The timing of the departures was arranged so that on 30 June the three convoys would be at Position K (35°N, 22°E), south of Cape Matapan, about halfway between Malta and Alexandria.

At  on 26 June, Caledon, Garland and Vampire sailed from Alexandria to rendezvous with Capetown, Nubian and Mohawk the next day while heading for the Dardanelles. A dawn on 27 June, five ships of the 2nd Destroyer Flotilla departed Alexandria and at  the 7th Cruiser Squadron left for Position K.

27 June

Four of the destroyers made depth-charge attacks and after the fifth an oil slick was seen and trailed by Dainty. The submarine had been badly damaged by the depth charging and was eventually forced to the surface.

A white light was taken to indicate a surrender; Dainty moved closer and began to take on survivors, along with other destroyers which lowered boats to pick up the Italians who had taken to the water. According to one British source, three hours fifteen minutes elapsed before the last two men from the submarine were taken off and the boat was sunk with depth charges. According to Italian sources,  was scuttled by its crew; ten men were killed in the engagement, including the commander  Lorenzo Bezzi, who went down with the submarine.

Battle

The Italian ships had the notional speed to outrun the cruisers but their age, heavy loads and the sea state meant that the British ships slowly caught up. The Italians had been taken by surprise and could not launch torpedoes because of their deck cargoes but they were difficult to hit as they made smoke, darkness gathered and the ships sailed towards the afterglow of the sun. At  Neptune reported torpedoes and the British ships changed course to comb the spread. At   was hit and brought to a stop.

As night was falling and short of ammunition, Tovey abandoned the chase ten minutes later and changed course for Malta. Men jumped from the burning ship and there was an explosion near the bridge. Sydney lowered both of its boats to rescue survivors and used Jacob's ladders and Bosun's chairs to bring them aboard. The glare from  before it sank and the presence of Italian submarines led to the rescue effort being ended at  when all 47 survivors in sight had been collected. Sydney left behind one of the cutters with oars, sails, foodstuffs, water and rifles, illuminated with a signal projector so that remaining survivors could board it. Three of the survivors died before the ship reached Alexandria and six others were found alive on a raft by the Italian submarine Topazio fourteen days later.

Aftermath

The engagement had lasted for about two hours and ten minutes; the 7th Cruiser Squadron fired about 5,000 shells. Some of the prisoners on Sydney disclosed the purpose of the operation, that  had a company of 225 men and passengers embarked and that Baroni had been killed in the explosion near the bridge. The ammunition consumption of the British cruisers exacerbated a shortage of ammunition at Alexandria, where only  shells were in stock. The Battle of the Espero Convoy demonstrated that a daylight naval action at long range was likely to be indecisive and wasteful of ammunition.

The 2nd Cruiser Division was so short of ammunition that it returned to Alexandria and the Malta convoys were postponed. The 1st Cruiser Division reached Alexandria on 1 July, having also been ineffectually bombed. Convoy  from the Aegean was attacked from 29 June to 1 July by Italian aircraft based in the Dodecanese Islands but reached Alexandria and Port Said undamaged on 2 and 3 July. In 1998, Greene and Massignani wrote that had Italian aircraft spotted the Allied cruisers before they came within range, all three destroyers could have escaped. Baroni was posthumously awarded the Gold Medal of Military Valour. The lack of ammunition and the danger of Italian submarines led to the two Malta convoy sailings being postponed for two weeks, followed by Operation  culminating in the Battle of Punta Stilo on 9 July 1940.

Subsequent operations

The submarine dived and was depth charged by three of the destroyers which forced it to the surface, where survivors were rescued. The prisoners talked of a submarine patrol line between Crete and the African coast and two destroyers were despatched from Alexandria to Derna on an anti-submarine sortie. The ships detected a submerged submarine on 1 July, attacked and claimed its sinking; when the ships returned on 2 July the claim was disallowed.  and  had reached Benghazi on 29 June and arrived at Tobruk shortly after. The smaller  and  also reached Libya after being diverted to the port of Tripoli.

On 5 July, nine Fairey Swordfish torpedo-bombers of 813 Naval Air Squadron, Fleet Air Arm, flew from Sidi Barrani in western Egypt, to attack the ships in Tobruk harbour. The Swordfish had twelve fighter escorts from 33 Squadron and 211 Squadron strafed the airfield, damaging eight Fiat CR.42 fighters, also flying several reconnaissance sorties. The destroyer  and the liner  were damaged. On the evening after the attack, 830 Naval Air Squadron from Malta bombed the airfield at Catania in Sicily.

Order of battle

Allies

Data taken from Greene and Massignani (2002) unless specified.
 Vice-Admiral John Tovey – 7th Cruiser squadron

1st Cruiser Division: light cruisers Orion (Flagship), Neptune, Sydney

2nd Cruiser Division: Town class cruisers Liverpool, Gloucester

Italy

Data taken from Greene and Massignani (2002) unless specified.
  Enrico Baroni

2nd Destroyer Squadron:  (Flagship),

Notes

Citations

References

Further reading

External links
 HMAS Sydney (II) RAN

Conflicts in 1940
1940 in Italy
Battle of the Mediterranean
Naval battles of World War II involving Italy
Espero
Naval battles of World War II involving Australia
Mediterranean convoys of World War II
June 1940 events